is a Japanese swimmer. He was born in Shizuoka. He competed in the 200 m individual medley event at the 2012 Summer Olympics, advanced to the final and finished sixth. Takakuwa also took part in the 200m IM at the 2008 Summer Olympics and placed fifth. In that same event at the Asian games, he won gold in 2010 and silver in 2006. He also won bronze in the 400m IM at the 2010 Asian Games.

References 

Living people
1985 births
People from Shizuoka (city)
Japanese male medley swimmers
Olympic swimmers of Japan
Swimmers at the 2008 Summer Olympics
Swimmers at the 2012 Summer Olympics
Asian Games medalists in swimming
Swimmers at the 2006 Asian Games
Swimmers at the 2010 Asian Games
Universiade medalists in swimming
Asian Games gold medalists for Japan
Asian Games silver medalists for Japan
Asian Games bronze medalists for Japan
Medalists at the 2006 Asian Games
Medalists at the 2010 Asian Games
Universiade silver medalists for Japan
Medalists at the 2007 Summer Universiade
20th-century Japanese people
21st-century Japanese people